Mundur is a town and gram panchayat in the Palakkad district, state of Kerala, India. Mundur is an important junction which connects National Highway 966  and State Highway 53. It is located about 11 km from Palakkad city and is one of the growing suburbs.

Population
 Mundur.I: 17,567 people
 Mundur.II: 11,177 people

References 

Gram panchayats in Palakkad district
Mundur (gram panchayat)
 
Suburbs of Palakkad
Cities and towns in Palakkad district